La Tour-d'Auvergne (before 1961: Latour) is a commune in the Puy-de-Dôme department in Auvergne in central France.

Geography
The commune of La Tour-d'Auvergne is located on the west slope of the Massif du Sancy, at the southwestern extremity of the Puy-de-Dôme departement. It is 60 km (37 miles) away from Clermont-Ferrand and is crossed by the départementale 203 linking the A89 motorway and the départementale 2089 to Besse-et-Saint-Anastaise and Issoire. La Tour-d'Auvergne was the chef-lieu of the canton until 2015, and was composed of eight communes (La Tour-d'Auvergne, Bagnols, Puy-de-Dôme, Cros, Puy-de-Dôme, Trémouille-Saint-Loup, Chastreix, Saint-Donat, Picherande and Saint-Genès-Champespe). On the Artense plateau, which extends itself in between Cantal and the Tarentaine river south, the dam retention of Bort-les-Orgues, the Corrèze and the Avèse gorges west, La Bourboule and Mont-Dore glacier valley north and the massif du Sancy east, La Tour-d'Auvergne is an ancient village which holds its foundations on a basaltic piton, an old vestige of a volcanic flow of the massif du Sancy when it was a volcano, more than 250 000 years ago. Standing on a natural promontory, the village is located in between the Burande valleys and its tributary, the Burandou.

See also
Communes of the Puy-de-Dôme department

References

Tourdauvergne
Puy-de-Dôme communes articles needing translation from French Wikipedia